Golam Hasnayen (1929/30 – 4 December 2021) was a Bangladeshi lawyer, veteran of the Bangladesh Liberation war, and recipient of the Ekushey Padak, the second highest civilian award in Bangladesh.

Life and career
Hasnayen was arrested during the Vutta Andolon in 1967. The Vutta Andolon were a series of riots, after locals fell ill after eating flour imported from West Pakistan, which they believed was poisoned.

He died on 4 December 2021, at the age of 91.

References

20th-century births
Year of birth uncertain
2021 deaths
Recipients of the Ekushey Padak
20th-century Pakistani lawyers
People of the Bangladesh Liberation War
People from Pabna District
20th-century Bangladeshi lawyers